Fora de Moda (Out of Style) is the second studio album by Rui Veloso, released in 1982.

With the exception of "Bucólica" ("Bucolic"), in which he made a song from a poem by Miguel Torga and "Ó Clotilde" (Carlos Tê), all of the tracks were recorded by himself and Carlos Tê

Track listing

References

External links
Fora de Moda at Rate Your Music

1982 albums
Rui Veloso albums